La Unión District is one of nine districts of the province Tarma in Peru.

References